Miss Philippines Earth 2004 was the 4th edition of the Miss Philippines Earth pageant. It was held on May 2, 2004 at the University of the Philippines Theater in Quezon City, Philippines.

The event was broadcast by ABS-CBN Network in the Philippines and The Filipino Channel internationally. Laura Marie Dunlap, Miss Philippines 2003 crowned her successor, Tamera Szijarto as Miss Philippines Earth 2004 at the conclusion of the event. Szijarto won against 23 other candidates and became the representative of Philippines in the international Miss Earth 2004 beauty pageant.

Results
Color keys

The following is the list of the placement of the winners:

Special awards
 Best in Evening Gown - #15 Rhea Francia Grims
 Best in Swimsuit - #21 Lyn Charisse Revilla
 Miss Talent - #10 Jasmin Chua
 Miss Photogenic - #13 Kathleen Hazel Go
 Miss Friendship - #18 Marella Hazel Olea
 Miss Sunsilk Silky Soft Hair - #1 Contessa Maria Santos
 Miss Cremesilk 100% Super Beautiful Hair - #20 Jhoanne Ople
 Miss Ponds Noticeably Beautiful Skin - #10 Jasmin Chua
 Miss Close-Up Smile - #8 Francis Dianne Cervantes
 Miss Avon - #24 Tamera Marie Szijarto
 Texter's Choice Award - #3 Keithley Anne Campos

Candidates
The following is the list of the official contestants of Miss Philippines Earth 2004 representing various regions in the Philippines:

See also
:Miss Earth 2003

References

External links
Official Website
Lil' Earth Angels Official Website

2004
2004 beauty pageants
2004 in the Philippines
May 2004 events in the Philippines